My Left Nut is a Northern Irish comedy-drama television miniseries produced by Rollem Productions for BBC Three. Based on the stage-play of the same name by Michael Patrick & Oisín Kearney, and drawing heavily on Patrick's own teenage years, the series follows 15-year old Mick (Nathan Quinn O'Rawe) as he discovers a swelling on his left testicle. The series was written by Patrick and Kearney and directed by Paul Gay.

The series was released on BBC Three and BBC iPlayer in the United Kingdom on 1 March 2020, followed by weekly airings on BBC One.

Premise
The series follows teenager Mick as he attempts to deal with his home and school life after discovering a swelling on his left testicle. His father having died years previously, Mick confides in his mother (Sinead Keenan) as he plucks up the courage to go to the doctor - all whilst trying to keep his swollen testicle from his friends Tommy and Conor, and his prospective girlfriend Rachael.

Cast
 Nathan Quinn O'Rawe as Michael "Mick" Campbell.
 Sinead Keenan as Patricia Campbell, Mick's mother. 
 Brian Milligan as Jimmy Campbell, Mick's dead father.
 Jessica Reynolds as Rachael, Mick's prospective girlfriend.
 Levi O'Sullivan as Conor, Mick's friend. 
 Oliver Anthony as Tommy, Mick's friend.
 Sade Malone as Siobhan, Rachael's friend.
 Lola Petticrew as Lucy, Mick's sister. 
 Jay Duffy as Danny, Lucy's boyfriend. 
 Odhran Carlin as Finn, Mick's brother. 
 Roger Thomson as Dr Gibbon, Mick's GP
 Gerard Jordan as Tommy's da.

Episodes

Production

Micheal Patrick and Oisín Kearney originally wrote My Left Nut as a one man show through the 'Show in a Bag' initiative run by Fishamble: The New Play Company in partnership with Dublin Fringe Festival and The Irish Theatre Institute. The theatre play was a semi-fictionalised version of Patrick's teenage years growing up in Belfast with a swollen testicle, it premiered at the Dublin Fringe 2017 before showing at Summerhall as part of Edinburgh Festival Fringe 2018. At the same time, Patrick and Kearney were part of BBC Writers' Room Belfast Voices, through which they pitched the idea of adapting their play for television to Rollem Productions.

Principal photography began on location in Belfast in August 2019. Specific locations in Belfast included St Mary's Christian Brothers' Grammar School, the Strand Cinema, Belfast Harbour and Ormeau Road.

Reception
The show received generally positive critical reviews, getting particular praise for its blend of comedy and drama, being described as "equal parts charmingly funny and strangely sincere" by The Guardian, and being compared favourably to similar series such as Derry Girls and The Inbetweeners. Liam Fay in The Sunday Times said: "There are echoes of everything from The Inbetweeners to Derry Girls, but the show has its own distinctive voice."

My Left Nut won Best Drama at the 2020 Royal Television Society Northern Ireland Awards  and won Best Drama, Best Writers (Michael Patrick & Oisín Kearney) and Best Actor (Nathan Quinn O'Rawe) at the 2021 Royal Television Society Yorkshire Awards. It was also nominated for Best Drama at the 2020 Broadcast Digital Awards.

References

External links 
 My Left Nut on BBC
 

BBC comedy-drama television shows
2020 British television series debuts
2020 British television series endings
Television series about teenagers
Television shows set in Belfast
Television shows set in Northern Ireland